Brigada S (Брига́да С) was a Soviet/Russian rock band fronted by Garik Sukachov which played dynamic mix of rough rock and roll, reggae and rhythm and blues marked by the effective use of the brass section. Formed in 1984 the self-described "proletarian jazz orchestra" released five albums (first two on tape), toured the United States (1988) and appeared in Savva Kulish's film The Tragedy in Rock (1988). In 1989 the participated in the Moscow Music Peace Festival which brought hard rock and metal acts from the United States and Europe to perform alongside Russian bands. They broke up in 1993. After the band's demise, Garik Sukachov went on to front Neprikasayemye (The Untouchables), while guitarist Sergey Galanin formed SerGa.

The original line-up
 Garik Sukachov - vocals, acoustic guitar
 Sergey Galanin - bass guitar, backing vocals
 Alexander Goryachev - guitar
 Lev Andreyev - keyboards
 Karen Sarkisov - percussion
 Igor Yartsev - drums 
 Leonid Chelyapov - saxophone
 Igor Markov - trumpet
 Yevgeny Korotkov - trumpet
 Maxim Likhachyov - trombone

Discography
 Добро пожаловать в запретную зону (Welcome to the Forbidden Zone, 1988, tape)
 Ностальгическое танго (The Nostalgic Tango, 1989)
 Аллергии — нет! (Say No! to Allergy, 1991)
 Всё это рок-н-ролл (All This Is Rock and Roll, 1991)
 Реки (Rivers, 1993)

References

Soviet rock music groups
Musical groups from Moscow
Russian rock music groups
Musical groups established in 1984